Nisam Antara is a district in North Aceh Regency, Nanggröe Aceh Darussalam, province of Indonesia.

Nisam Antara has several villages, namely:
 Alue Dua
 Alue Papeun
 Seumirah
 Blang Jrat
 Blang Pohroh
 Darussalam

North Aceh Regency
Districts of Aceh